Capital City Speedway was a racetrack in Ottawa, Ontario, Canada, located  southwest of Stittsville, Ontario. The Speedway included a dragstrip and a 3/8th mile oval, and ran five different series including the 4 For Fun class, Mini Stock Class, Thunder Car Class, ACT Late Model Class and the Lentch Automotive Legends Class. The Speedway's racing season ran from May until September annually. The Speedway has been closed since 2015.

History
Capital City Speedway was founded in 1961 after the closure of the very popular Lansdowne Speedway. Lansdowne ran from 1955 until 1960 where the track had been a success, gathering 5,000 fans on its June 1, 1955 opening night.  The track had been an old horse racing track that was in Lansdowne Park surrounding the football field where the Ottawa Rough Riders CFL team played. Many spectators and drivers came from as far as Montreal and New York State to race at the 1/3-mile track. But with the track being located in Ottawa's residential section, the noise created by the cars had local families unhappy. Neighbourhood complaints meant that the popular track had to close. After its closure, Gerry Bisson, who had been the race promoter, constructed a state of the art track near Stittsville, Ontario, just west of Ottawa, known as Capital City Speedway.

In 1994 Penny Bell (owner of restaurant Penny’s Pit Stop in Perth, Ontario) bought the speedway and changed the name back to Capital City Speedway from former name Ottawa Valley Speedway. The track held races every Wednesday night during the summer along with other special events.

The 2010 season started with a new race promoter, driver Jeremy Coulter. There were many "rain outs" and there were only a handful of full nights completed. Coulter, who started the year as a manager for the track (hired by the Drummond family), resigned halfway through the season.

The 2015 season was to be saved by Mr Shawn Kerr, after many drivers meetings the Drummond family decided not to go with him.

2010 Series champions

Source Capital City Speedway

Other race events

Monster Jam
Since 2006, in the first couple weeks on September, Capital City Speedway hosts Monster Jam. It consists of increased laps and payouts for each racing series, but for the ACT Late Models, in includes a 100 lap feature race and a $2000.00 payout. Following the 100 Lap Race is an Enduro Race, the fun and messy Trailer Race and Monster trucks Brutis and Avenger seen on Speed TV's Monster Jam show.

In 2009, due to only 8 late models showing up, the 100 lap race was moved down to three 25 lap races and used a points system to see who'd win.

American Canadian Tour (Série ACT)
Série ACT (ACT) has raced at Capital City Speedway. Série ACT is a very talented racing league based out of the northeast United States and southern Canada. The Série ACT race was known as the Toromont Cat 100 and is a 100 lapped race.

References

External links
 Capital City Speedway

Motorsport venues in Ontario
Paved oval racing venues in Ontario